Figueira da Foz, also known as Figueira for short, is a city and a municipality in the Coimbra District, in Portugal. The city of Figueira da Foz proper has a population of 46,600. It is the second largest city in the district of Coimbra.

It is a coastal city with several beaches, summer and seaport facilities on the Atlantic Ocean coast. As a tourism city, it plays an important part in the centre of the country. A zone of legal gambling, one can find in Figueira one of the biggest casinos of the Iberian Peninsula – the Casino Figueira.

History
According to the legend, the place's name is due to a fig tree, which stood at the quay of Salmanha, where the fishermen used to tie up their boats. Foz means "place of discharge", often used at the point a river meets another body of water, specially where there is a clear energy or water flow clash. Some historical traces show that people were settling in this region since the Neolithic age. The oldest known document, however, dates from the year 1096. In this, an abbot named Pedro donates estates, which belonged to the church of S. Julião, to the cathedral Sé Velha of Coimbra.

Knowing the great importance rivers had in the development of cities and of ancient civilizations, the mouth of the Mondego must have played a central role in the fixation of men in this region and for the formation of settlements, which were the beginning of the city of Figueira da Foz. Figueira da Foz had a huge development during the 18th and 19th centuries due to the immense port movements and the expansion of the shipbuilding and cod drying industry, supplying the city with new communication routes, housing and other facilities. It was elevated to vila (small town) on 12 March 1771 and turned city (cidade) on 20 September 1882. Discovered as a sea resort by the end of the 19th century, it gained a great reputation in the 1920s and 1930s. The city had the Portuguese nickname of Rainha das Praias (Queen of the Beaches).

The municipality has some noted landmarks like the Sotto Mayor Palace, the old fishing village of Buarcos, the Serra da Boa Viagem – a small forested mountain by the Atlantic Ocean, several beaches, and its large seaside promenade paved with typical Portuguese pavement. Figueira da Foz has several Churches, many of them in the rich Baroque style, a Municipal Museum with the archaeological, ethnographic and artistic collection, the Santa Catarina Fort and the old Buarcos Fortress, the Relógio Tower by the main sandy beach, several archaeological vestiges throughout the municipality, several Palaces and Manor Houses (like the Sotto Mayor Palace), as well as several green spaces and small gardens like those in the area of Abadias.

Economy
The city is an important industrial centre, producing wood pulp and paper (Navigator, formerly and still commonly known as Soporcel, and Celbi, part of Altri) and glass (Verallia, part of Saint-Gobain). It also has notable naval construction and fish industries. Until the turn of the 21st century, a factory of the CIMPOR Group was installed in the Mondego Cape (Cabo Mondego). The seaport and the fishing harbour are also important for its economy.

With its old and renowned casino (Casino da Figueira), the marina, several hotels, restaurants and other tourist facilities, Figueira is actually a very important Atlantic beach resort, in the center of Portugal's Silver Coast/Costa de Prata tourism region. A generally windy coastal area, its relatively cold seawaters are particularly renowned as a surf and kitesurf hotspot in the same fashion as other places throughout the west coast of Portugal, such as Nazaré, Peniche or Ericeira. In July and August, its main beaches are usually packed with beachgoers too.

Education
The city has well-equipped kindergartens, schools and high schools. It had two private universities: the Catholic University of Portugal (Figueira da Foz branch) and the Internacional University (Figueira da Foz branch) but they were closed in 2009 due to lack of funds and academic integrity. The municipality of Figueira da Foz is served by the ancient University of Coimbra and the Polytechnic Institute of Coimbra located 40 kilometers to the east of the city, in the district capital Coimbra.

Parishes
Administratively, the municipality is divided into 14 civil parishes (freguesias):

 Alhadas
 Alqueidão
 Bom Sucesso
 Buarcos
 Ferreira-a-Nova
 Lavos
 Maiorca
 Marinha das Ondas
 Moinhos da Gândara
 Paião
 Quiaios
 São Pedro 
 Tavarede
 Vila Verde

Demographics

Geography
Figueira is about 40 kilometers west of Coimbra by the Atlantic Ocean and less than 200 kilometers to the north of Lisbon, on the mouth of the Mondego River and at the foothills of the Serra da Boa Viagem (mountain). The Cabo Mondego (cape) is inserted in the context of the Lusitanian Basin and is located on the western edge of the Serra da Boa Viagem (latitude 40º 11´ 3´´ N, longitude 08º 54´34´´W), approximately 6 km to the northwest of the city of Figueira da Foz proper. Classified as a Natural Monument since 2007, the cape is one of the most important testimonies for understanding the geological history of Portugal; represents, in a particularly complete way, some of the most important episodes in the history of the Earth that occurred during the Jurassic, for a time interval that is, approximately, between 185 and 140 million years, which justifies, at international level, the relevance of its classification, conservation and dissemination. The outcrop comprises a series of marine and fluvial-lake sediments that extend from the Upper Toarciano to the Titonian. This record, on some levels, is particularly continuous and rich in paleontological, sedimentological and paleomagnetic information, which are associated with exceptional observation conditions. It includes levels with the oldest footprints of megalosaurs (bipedal and carnivorous dinosaurs) described in Portugal and whose first reference dates from 1884.

Climate
Figueira da Foz has a warm-summer Mediterranean climate (Köppen: Csb) characterized by mild, rainy winters and dry, warm summers. In the summer afternoons moderate to (occasionally) strong north-westerly winds are common. Subtropical Storm Alpha, notable for being the only tropical or subtropical cyclone to make landfall in Portugal on record, made landfall at peak intensity in the general vicinity of the city on 18 September 2020. Figueira da Foz was, however, particularly hit hard when Storm (Hurricane) Leslie made landfall in mainland Europe right within the city on 13 October 2018.

Beaches of Figueira da Foz

Praia da Figueira da Foz – Relógio – Praia da Bola de Nivea (Europe's widest urban beach)
Praia da Gala – Figueira da Foz (Cova Gala)
Praia da Murtinheira – Figueira da Foz
Praia do Cabo Mondego – Figueira da Foz
Praia da Leirosa – Figueira da Foz
Praia da Costa de Lavos – Figueira da Foz
Praia da Orbitur – Figueira da Foz
Praia da Cova – Cova Gala (Figueira da Foz)
Praia do Cabedelo – Figueira da Foz (Cova Gala)
Praia da Claridade – Figueira da Foz
Praia de Buarcos – Tamargueira (Figueira da Foz) e Plataforma (Figueira da Foz)
Praia do Vale do Emide – Figueira da Foz
Praia de Quiaios – Figueira da Foz (Quiaios)

Gallery

Sports
Figueira da Foz is home to Associação Naval 1º Maio, best known for its football team  which spent six seasons between 2005 and 2011 in the national top tier, the Primeira Liga. The city is also the home of the basketball department of Ginásio Clube Figueirense which competes in the Portuguese basketball league, adding rowing and swimming to their more notorious activities.

The Tennis Club da Figueira da Foz was founded in 1917 and is still located next to the Santa Catarina Fort at the mouth of the Mondego River today.

The city hosted the Mundialto international beachsoccer tournament from 1997 to 2004.

International surf competitions frequently take place in Figueira like the World Surf Championship 2010 or the IFCA Slaloms Worlds 2008.

Transport

Road 

Figueira da Foz is accessed by motorways A14, linking it to Coimbra and A1, and A17, linking it to Aveiro and A25 (reaching Spain) to the north and Leiria and A8 to the south. There are intercity bus services to Lisbon, Porto, Leiria, Aveiro and Viseu. There are also regional bus services to Coimbra and places in between.

Rail 

The city is served by its own railway terminus, with suburban trains linking it to Coimbra and some regional trains running along the Western Line, although there is no direct railway service to Lisbon or Porto. , 36 km to the east, is the closest station serving high-speed Alfa Pendular trains. Both have scheduled links to Lisbon, Porto and other major cities across Portugal. , slightly closer at 32 km to the southeast, also serves Alfa Pendular trains, but there is no direct railway link between the two cities.

Water 

Figueira da Foz has its own seaport,  along river Mondego, featuring a marina, a container terminal and naval shipyards. In addition, there are facilities for watersports, in particular rowing.

Air 

The city does not have its own airport. The closest international airport to Figueira da Foz is Porto Airport (OPO), located 120 km to the north and offering several international destinations primarily in Europe, although Lisbon Airport (LIS), located 155 km to the south, offers more intercontinental destinations, in particular to North America, South America and Africa. The closest aerodrome handling private flights is Bissaya Barreto Aerodrome (CBP) in Coimbra, 32 km to the east, where the Aeroclube da Figueira da Foz is based. The closest runway capable of handling widebody aircraft is at Monte Real Air Base in Leiria, some 40 km to the south, but it is home to the Portuguese Air Force's jet fighter aircraft, making it difficult to convert the airbase to commercial aviation due to its strategic position in Portugal's defence system.

An international airport in Figueira da Foz, the Silver Coast International Airport, was planned in the early 1990s, which was to be located in Lavos, 7 km south of the city centre—it has never been built.

International Relations
Figueira da Foz is twinned with:

  Angoche, Nampula, Mozambique
  Ciudad Rodrigo, Castile and León, Spain
  Gradignan, Gironde, France
  Mortágua, Viseu, Portugal
  New Bedford, Massachusetts, USA
  Praia, Santiago, Cabo Verde
  Yevpatoria, Crimea, Ukraine

Notable people

 Lucrécia de Arriaga (1844–1927), the wife of Manuel de Arriaga, the first President of Portugal, thus the first First Lady of Portugal, 1911 to 1915
 David de Souza, (Wiki PT) (1880-1918), composer, conductor and cellist
 Luís Wittnich Carrisso (1886–1937), a botanist, professor at the University of Coimbra 
 Carlos Galvão de Melo (1921–2008), a Portuguese Air Force officer and politician
 João César Monteiro (1939–2003), film director, actor, writer and film critic.
 João Mário Grilo (born 1958), a film director, author and professor.
 Afonso Cruz (born 1971), a Portuguese novelist, animator, illustrator and musician
 Nuno Camarneiro (born 1977), a Portuguese novelist.
 Marco Mendes (born 1978), a Portuguese artist and comic author. 
 Susana Guerra (born 1980), stage name Suzy, singer, rep. for Portugal in Eurovision Song Contest 2014
 Rita Camarneiro (born 1988), TV presenter, actress and comedian.

Sport 
 José Bento Pessoa (1874–1954), a Portuguese record-winning cyclist.
 Alves Barbosa (1931–2018), a Portuguese professional road cyclist.
 Ticha Penicheiro (born 1974), a sports agent and former WNBA basketball player
 Rui Cordeiro (born 1976), rugby union footballer
 Sérgio Grilo (born 1983), a retired footballer and coach with over 300 club caps.
 Hugo Almeida (born 1984), a former footballer with 409 club caps and 57 for Portugal

See also
Região de Coimbra
Coimbra District
Mondego River
Centro Region, Portugal

References

External links

Central Tourist Region
Figueira's da Foz Municipality
Photos from Figueira da Foz
Surf Camp and Surfing Holidays in Figueira da Foz
Hostel Figueira da Foz
Surf Camp Figueira da Foz
Things to do in Figueira da Foz
Buarcos Surf Report
Events in Figueira da Foz
Surf school in Figueira da Foz – Cabedelo

 
Port cities and towns in Portugal
Seaside resorts in Portugal
Populated places in Coimbra District
Populated coastal places in Portugal
Municipalities of Coimbra District
Cities in Portugal